Flummadiddle is a baked main course pudding consisting of stale bread, pork fat, molasses, and spices including cinnamon, allspice, and cloves. It was a part of early American cuisine, especially of New England fishermen.

See also
 List of bread dishes

References 
 Frederic Gomes, Dictionary of American Regional English: Introduction and A-C, Harvard University Press, 1985, page 500. .
 Sarah Orne Jewett, "A Summer Cruise in Search of an Appetite", Harper's new monthly magazine, Harper & Bros, 1857, page 538.

New England cuisine
Bread puddings